McCall House and variations may refer to:

United States
(by state then city)

J.M. McCall House, Marshall, Arkansas, listed on the NRHP in Searcy County, Arkansas
Vinie McCall House, Marshall, Arkansas, listed on the NRHP in Searcy County, Arkansas
Cormack McCall House, Faribault, Minnesota, listed on the NRHP in Rice County, Minnesota
Thomas McCall House, Faribault, Minnesota, listed on the NRHP in Rice County, Minnesota
Tracy McCall House, Fromberg, Montana, listed on the NRHP in Carbon County, Montana
McCall House (Fayetteville, North Carolina), NRHP-listed
John McCall House, Ashland, Oregon, listed on the NRHP in Jackson County, Oregon
Clarence McCall House, Darlington, South Carolina, listed on the NRHP in Darlington County, South Carolina
Smithson-McCall Farm, Bethesda, Tennessee, NRHP-listed